Canda is a genus of bryozoans belonging to the family Candidae.

The genus has almost cosmopolitan distribution.

Species:

Canda alsia 
Canda arachnoides 
Canda caraibica 
Canda clypeata 
Canda federicae 
Canda filifera 
Canda foliifera 
Canda fossilis 
Canda giorgioi 
Canda indica 
Canda inermis 
Canda inermis 
Canda ligata 
Canda munita 
Canda pecten 
Canda pecten 
Canda philippinensis 
Canda rathbuni 
Canda rectangulata 
Canda retiformis 
Canda scutata 
Canda simplex 
Canda tenuis 
Canda triangulata 
Canda williardi

References

Bryozoan genera